Ferndale ward is an electoral ward in the London Borough of Lambeth, England. It contains parts of Brixton and Clapham. It includes the Brixton Academy.

Ferndale ward is located in the Vauxhall parliamentary constituency.

Former Notable Councillors
John Major, Prime Minister of the United Kingdom and Councillor from 1968 to 1972.

Former Notable Residents
Jeremy Hunt, Conservative MP and former Secretary of State for Health.
David Bowie, Singer and Musician 
Levi Roots, Musician and Entrepreneur

Lambeth Council elections 2018 
The 2018 Lambeth council elections took place on Thursday May 3, 2018 with three councillors elected.
 2018 result

References

External links
Lambeth Borough Council profile for the ward
Ferndale ward results on Lambeth website
Local Labour Party Friends of Ferndale website

Wards of the London Borough of Lambeth